The 1923–24 Bethlehem Steel F.C. season was the third season for the club in the American Soccer League. The club finished the season in 2nd place but won the American Cup.

American Soccer League

Pld = Matches played; W = Matches won; D = Matches drawn; L = Matches lost; GF = Goals for; GA = Goals against; Pts = Points

National Challenge Cup

American Football Association Cup

Exhibitions

Notes and references
Bibliography

Footnotes

Bethlehem Steel F.C.
American Soccer League (1921–1933) seasons
Bethlehem Steel F.C.